The 2007 IIHF World Championship rosters consisted of 393 players on 16 national ice hockey teams. Run by the International Ice Hockey Federation (IIHF), the Ice Hockey World Championships is the sport's highest-profile annual international tournament. The 2007 IIHF World Championship was the 71st edition of the tournament and was held in Moscow and Mytischi, Russia. Canada won the Championship, the 24th time they had done so.

Before the start of the World Championship, each participating nation had to submit a list of players for its roster. A minimum of fifteen skaters and two goaltenders, and a maximum of twenty skaters and three goaltenders had to be selected. If a country selects fewer than the maximum allowed, they must choose the remaining players prior to the start of the tournament. After the start of the tournament, each team was allowed to select an additional two players, either skaters or goaltenders, to their roster, for a maximum roster of 25 players. Once players were registered to the team, they could not be removed from the roster.

To qualify for a national team under IIHF rules, a player must follow several criteria. He must be a citizen of the nation, and be under the jurisdiction of that national association. Players are allowed to switch which national team they play for, providing they fulfill the IIHF criteria. If participating for the first time in an IIHF event, the player would have had to play two consecutive years in the national competition of the new country without playing in another country. If the player has already played for a national team before, he may switch countries if he is a citizen of the new country, and has played for four consecutive years in the national competition of the new country. This switch may only happen once in the player's life.

Rick Nash of Canada was named the tournament's most valuable player by the IIHF directorate. Aleksey Morozov of Russia led the tournament in goal scoring, and was named the top forward. Russian Andrei Markov was named top defenceman and Kari Lehtonen of Finland was selected as top goaltender. Sweden's Johan Davidsson was the tournament's leading scorer and Alexander Eremenko of Russia led goaltenders in save percentage, with 0.957.


Legend

Austria

Skaters

Goaltenders

Belarus

Skaters

Goaltenders

Canada

Skaters

Goaltenders

Czech Republic

Skaters

Goaltenders

Denmark

Skaters

Goaltenders

Finland

Skaters

Goaltenders

Germany

Skaters

Goaltenders

Italy

Skaters

Goaltenders

Latvia

Skaters

Goaltenders

Norway

Skaters

Goaltenders

Russia

Skaters

Goaltenders

Slovakia

Skaters

Goaltenders

Sweden

Skaters

Goaltenders

Switzerland

Skaters

Goaltenders

Ukraine

Skaters

Goaltenders

United States

Skaters

Goaltenders

References

Team rosters

Austria
Belarus
Canada
Czech Republic
Denmark
Finland
Germany
Italy
Latvia
Norway
Russia
Slovakia
Sweden
Switzerland
Ukraine
United States

Player statistics

Austria
Belarus
Canada
Czech Republic
Denmark
Finland
Germany
Italy
Latvia
Norway
Russia
Slovakia
Sweden
Switzerland
Ukraine
United States

rosters
IIHF World Championship rosters